Screen on the Green is an annual summertime event in  Atlanta's Piedmont Park.  Originally sponsored by Turner Classic Movies,  the event has been hosted during the last few years by local Atlanta television station Peachtree TV.  Screen on the Green consists of free movies shown on a large screen outdoors.  The event typically draws between 5,000 and 10,000 people for each film. Through the 2007 series screen, tents, glass containers, pets, and grills are not allowed at the event.

Due to drought conditions in Piedmont Park during the 2008 and 2009 seasons, the event was temporarily moved to Centennial Olympic Park. It returned to Piedmont Park for the 2010 season.

In 2010, several of the early movies were disrupted by altercations including several acts of random violence. While additional security was provided for later movies, many long-time attendees were shaken by the events.

In 2011, Screen on the Green was cancelled because of lack of funding from Peachtree TV after a management change. Weeks later, Screen on the Green was saved by new sponsors. It was canceled again in 2012. In 2013, the event was held in Centennial Olympic Park.

2011 movies
 June 2 - Back to the Future
 June 9 - Imitation of Life
 June 16 - Sixteen Candles
 June 23 - Viewers Choice – The Birds, 1963 vs. Frankenstein, 1931
 June 30 - Willy Wonka & the Chocolate Factory

2010 movies
 May 27 --- National Treasure
 June 3 --- Transformers: Revenge of the Fallen
 June 10 --- Dreamgirls
 June 17 --- Star Wars Episode IV: A New Hope
 June 24 --- Jurassic Park

2009 movies
 May 28 --- Back to the Future
 June 4 --- Dreamgirls (not played due to inclement weather)
 June 11 --- Field of Dreams
 June 18 --- Home Alone
 June 25 --- Ghostbusters (decided by online vote)

2008 movies
 May 29 --- Jaws
 June 5 --- Big Momma's House
 June 12 --- Chicago
 June 19 --- E.T. the Extra-Terrestrial
 June 26 --- Footloose (decided by online vote)

2007 movies
 May 31 --- Casablanca
 June 7 --- Car Wash
 June 14 --- Butch Cassidy and the Sundance Kid
 June 21 --- Funny Girl
 June 28 --- E.T. the Extra-Terrestrial (not played due to rain and inclement weather)

2006 movies
 June 1 --- Houseguest
 June 8 --- The Wiz
 June 15 --- Ferris Bueller's Day Off
 June 21 --- Breakfast at Tiffany's
 June 28 --- Willy Wonka & the Chocolate Factory

2005 movies
 June 2 --- Some Like It Hot
 June 9 --- To Kill a Mockingbird
 June 16 --- The Birds
 June 23 --- Mommie Dearest
 June 30 --- Grease

External links
Official site

References

Festivals in Atlanta
Tourist attractions in Atlanta